La Conga Nights is a 1940 American comedy film directed by Lew Landers and written by Jay Dratler, Harry Clork and Paul Gerard Smith. The film stars Hugh Herbert, Dennis O'Keefe, Constance Moore, Ferike Boros, Eddie Quillan and Armida. The film was released on May 31, 1940, by Universal Pictures.

Plot
Rhumba music lover as well as millionaire playboy Henry I. Dibble, Jr. usually by his side are his four maiden sisters Faith, Hope, Charity and Prudence. They order Junior to evict Mama O'Brien from property owned by the Dibble estate because she can not pay the rent, but Junior decides to move in when he hears rhumba music coming from the property.

Cast         
Hugh Herbert as Henry I. Dibble Jr. / Faith Dibble / Hope Dibble / Charity Dibble / Prudence Dibble / Mrs. Henry I. Dibble Jr. / Henry I. Dibble Sr.
Dennis O'Keefe as Steve Collins
Constance Moore as Helen Curtiss
Ferike Boros as Mama O'Brien
Eddie Quillan as Titus Endover
Armida as Carlotta De Vera
Joe Brown Jr. as Delancey O'Brien
Sally Payne as Lucy Endover
Frank Orth as Dennis O'Brien
Barnett Parker as Hammond

References

External links
 

1940 films
American comedy films
1940 comedy films
Universal Pictures films
Films directed by Lew Landers
American black-and-white films
1940s English-language films
1940s American films